Blixen can refer to the following,
 Baron Bror von Blixen-Finecke, Swedish born African big game hunter, commonly known as Bror Blixen.
 Carlos Blixen, Uruguayan basketball player, Olympic medalist in 1956
 Hans von Blixen-Finecke, (Bror's twin brother) and his son, Hans von Blixen-Finecke, Jr., both Olympic medal winners in equestrian events.
 Hyalmar Blixen, Uruguayan writer 
 Karen Blixen, (Bror's wife) Danish born novelist.
 3318 Blixen a main belt asteroid, named after the novelist.